Vidhichathum Kothichathum is a 1982 Indian Malayalam-language film, directed and produced by T. S. Mohan. The film stars Vincent, Vijayan, Mammootty, Adoor Bhasi, Jose and Krishnachandran . The film has musical score by Raveendran.

Cast

Vincent
Vijayan
Mammootty (Dubbed by Sreenivasan)
Lalu Alex as Suresh
Adoor Bhasi
Jose
Krishnachandran
Ratheesh
Sathaar
Adoor Bhavani
G. K. Pillai
Kundara Johny
Ranipadmini

Soundtrack
The music was composed by Raveendran and the lyrics were written by Poovachal Khader.

References

External links
 

1982 films
1980s Malayalam-language films